The Hudson Super Six Coach is an automobile which was first manufactured by the Hudson Motor Car Company of Detroit, Michigan in 1916. The first model was kept in production until 1928. The nameplate was revived for a rebadged Essex for 1933 (single model year only), and then returned again from 1940 until 1951, aside from a wartime hiatus. The 1951s were actually called "Hudson Super Custom Six".

First generation (1916)
The first Hudson Super Six was introduced on 16 January, 1916. Also known as the Series H, the Super Six was an early performance car. The last record stood until 1931, when a Marmon took it.

In John Steinbecks novel The Grapes of Wrath, the Joad family depends on a Hudson Super Six sedan converted into a truck. In the 1940 filmatization, the car used is a 1926 model. This car was put into storage after filming ended and, after having been discovered in a rather dilapidated condition, converted into a Speedster in 2009.

Second generation (1927)
For 1927, the Hudson Super Six received a complete redesign including a new F-head engine, 18-inch wood spoke wheels (rather than 21 inches) and four-wheel brakes. Two standard bodies were available, a two-door Coach and a four-door Sedan. The Model O was also available with five different Custom bodystyles, made by Biddle and Smart of Massachusetts. The engine was updated in July 1927, with a new manifold and a different head design, including the relocation of the spark plugs and intake valves. Hudson chose not to increase the claimed power, but many consider the stated output to be very conservative.

In 1927, Essex also chose the Super Six label for their cars, while aligning their design with that of the larger Hudsons. Essex kept calling their cars Super Sixes in 1928 and off and on until 1932.

For 1928, the Model O and Model S continued with some styling changes, including a taller and slimmer radiator, larger, more oval headlights, and vertical louvers on the hood. Also new was a standard-bodied Coupe on the Model S chassis, as well as a Biddle and Smart-bodied roadster on the same short wheelbase. Murphy Body of Pasadena designed the custom bodies used on the Model O, although Hudson chose Biddle and Smart to build these designs. For 1929 the Super Six badge was dropped in favor of the "Greater Hudson" label, and for 1930 all Hudsons had eight-cylinder engines. The 1929 R and L models' wheelbases were stretched by about four inches, the wheels were changed to 19-inch wire wheels, but they carried over the Super Six engine as well as the Murphy-designed/Biddle and Smart-made bodies.

Third generation (1933)

Hudson's lesser sister brand Essex had been using the "Super Six" name since model year 1928. The fading Essex brand began 1932 selling their cars as the "Greater Essex Super-Six," then the "Essex Super-Six Pacemaker", and finally as simply the "Essex Pacemaker." This car, largely unchanged, was also sold as the Hudson Super-Six "Pacemaker" in 1933 only, in parallel with the cheaper Essex-Terraplane which was kept in production (minus the "Essex" moniker) for 1934. While the low cost Essex-Terraplane sat on a  wheelbase, the Series E Hudson Super-Six has . The engine displaced  and produced  depending on the compression ratio.

Fourth generation (1940)
For the 1940 model year, Hudson reintroduced the "Super Six" nameplate again. This time it sat on a six-cylinder version of the new Hudson Eight, sharing that car's  wheelbase. This was five inches longer than that of the regular Hudson Six, which was available as either the Traveler or DeLuxe. The regular Six was called Series 40T and 40P respectively, whereas the Super Six was Series 41. This engine was also shared with the large Hudson Country Club Six, with its  wheelbase, as well as the Hudson Big Boy series of commercial vehicles.

Body styles started with a 3-passenger Coupe or a 5-passenger Victoria Coupe (sharing the same sheetmetal), continuing with a two- or four-door Touring Sedan, and culminating with a two-door Convertible Coupe as well as the two-door Convertible Sedan (seating five people). Marking the period move towards envelope styling and away from separate fenders, all versions could be had with or without running boards at no extra cost.

See also
 Hudson Motor Car Company

References

Source: 

Super Six